Modernist Pizza is a 2021 cookbook by Nathan Myhrvold and Francisco Migoya. The book is focused on pizza, its history and baking techniques, and a guide to the science behind it.

Structure 
Modernist Pizza consists of three volumes and a manual:
 Volume 1: History and Fundamentals ("research into pizza’s history and place in the world at large, plus our guide to top pizza destinations. It also covers the science of pizza dough ingredients and pizza ovens.")
 Volume 2: Techniques and Ingredients ("The chapters herein provide detailed information about pizza-making techniques and the fundamental components of pizza: dough, sauce, cheese, and toppings.")
 Volume 3: Recipes ("The third volume houses foundational recipes for every pizza style in the book with both iconic pizzas and pizzas with innovative flavor themes. It wraps up with information on how to serve and store pizza.")
 Recipe Manual ("412-page wire-bound kitchen manual, plus reference tables")

Reception 
The book received positive reviews. The Cooking World called it "a fabulous multivolume set that captures Pizza's global history, culture, and styles and gives both professional and home pizza makers the tools to refine their skills and become an innovator of their craft."

References

External links 
 Modernist Pizza Podcast

2021 non-fiction books
Cookbooks